Maretiidae is a family of echinoderms belonging to the order Spatangoida.

Genera
Genera:
 Amoraster McNamara & Ah Yee, 1989
 Granobrissoides Lambert, 1920
 Gymnopatagus Döderlein, 1901
 Hemimaretia Mortensen, 1950
 Homolampas A.Agassiz, 1874
 Maretia Gray, 1855
 Mariania Airaghi, 1901
 Mazettia Lambert & Thiéry, 1915
 Murraypneustes Holmes, Yee & Krause, 2005
 Nacospatangus A.Agassiz, 1873
 Pycnolampas A.Agassiz & H.L.Clark, 1907
 Spatagobrissus H.L.Clark, 1923
 Tripatagus Zachos, 2012

References

Spatangoida
Echinoderm families